is a 1969 Japanese drama art film directed and written by Toshio Matsumoto, loosely adapted from Oedipus Rex and set in the underground gay culture of 1960s Tokyo. It stars Peter as the protagonist, a young transgender woman, and features Osamu Ogasawara, Yoshio Tsuchiya and Emiko Azuma. A product of the Japanese New Wave, the film combines elements of arthouse, documentary and experimental cinema, and is thought to have influenced Stanley Kubrick's film adaptation of Anthony Burgess' novel A Clockwork Orange (1971) (although many of the points of comparison can also be found in earlier movies such as Rainer Werner Fassbinder's Love Is Colder Than Death).

The title is a pun, as "rose" (bara) in Japanese can have a similar meaning to "pansy" in English slang.

The film was released by A.T.G. (Art Theatre Guild) on 13 September 1969 in Japan; however, it did not receive a United States release until 29 October 1970. Matsumoto's previous film For My Crushed Right Eye contains some of the same footage and could be interpreted as a trailer for Funeral Parade. In June 2017, it received a 4K restoration and a limited theatrical rerelease. In 2020, it received a limited edition Blu-ray release from the British Film Institute in the UK.

Plot
The film follows the trials and tribulations of Eddie and other transgender women in Tokyo. The main plot continuously jumps around the timeline of events. The film also contains scenes shot in a documentary style, in which the film's cast members are interviewed about their sexuality and gender identity.

As a child, Eddie was abused by her father. When her father abandons Eddie and her mother, Eddie suggests to her mother that, though her husband has left them, she still has Eddie to rely on, and her mother laughs at her. Some time later, Eddie finds her mother with another man, and Eddie stabs them both using a knife.

Now an adult, Eddie works at the Genet, a gay bar in Tokyo that employs several transgender women to service customers. The Genet is managed by drug dealer Gonda, with whom Leda, the madame or "lead girl" of the bar, lives and is in a relationship. Leda correctly begins to suspect that Eddie and Gonda have a secret sexual relationship, and Gonda promises to make Eddie the new madame of the bar.

One day, Eddie witnesses a street protest and enters an art exhibit, where a voice on a tape recorder speaks about individuals masking their personalities, "wearing" one or more "masks" in order to avoid loneliness. Eddie also goes shopping with friends, visiting clothing stores and a hair salon, eating ice cream and entering a men's bathroom, where they stand in front of urinals in their skirts. Eddie also associates with Guevara, a member of a filmmaking collective who makes avant-garde films. After viewing one of Guevara's works, Eddie and others smoke marijuana and dance.

While out with two friends, Eddie and two friends are confronted by a trio of women, and a fight ensues. Gonda visits Leda and is angered when she feigns concern for Eddie's well-being. Leda is later found lying in her bed, having died by suicide, wearing a veil and surrounded by roses. On the floor are two dolls, one with a nail in its upper chest, and the other with a nail in each eye.

After Leda's funeral, Eddie is promoted to madame of the Genet. While Eddie takes a shower, Gonda finds a book containing a photograph of Eddie as a young boy, with her parents. Though a hole has been burnt through the face of Eddie's father in the picture, Gonda recognizes Eddie's mother as his former lover. Realizing that Eddie is his child, Gonda kills himself with a knife. Upon seeing this, Eddie takes the knife and stabs herself in each eye, before stumbling outside in front of a crowd of people.

Cast
 Peter as Eddie
 Osamu Ogasawara as Leda
 Yoshio Tsuchiya as Gonda
 Emiko Azuma as Eddie's mother
 Toyosaburo Uchiyama as Guevara
 Don Madrid as Tony
 Koichi Nakamura as Juju
 Chieko Kobayashi as Okei
 Shōtarō Akiyama as himself
 Kiyoshi Awazu as himself

Production
The film was set and shot in Tokyo.

Reception

Retrospective assessments
On Rotten Tomatoes, the film has an approval rating of 100% based on 19 reviews, with an average rating of 8.5/10.

In 2017, IndieWires Michael Nordine gave the film a grade of "A-", calling it "very much a trip, the kind you might not be able to make sense of at every step of the way but later, after returning to reality, will be glad to have embarked on." That same year, Simon Abrams of RogerEbert.com gave the film a score of four out of four stars, concluding: "You may not directly identify with Eddie or her world, but you will walk away from Matsumoto's film with a newfound appreciation of what movies can be." In 2020, Peter Bradshaw of The Guardian gave the film five out of five stars, calling it "a fusillade of haunted images and traumatised glimpses, splattered across a realist melodrama of the Tokyo underground club scene, played out in a fiercely beautiful monochrome", as well as "a jagged shard of a film, an underground dream of longing and despair, an excursion away from narrative and a great example of the Japanese New Wave [...]".

References

Sources
  薔薇の葬列 (Bara no Sōretsu) at the Japanese Movie Database
 "Eros Effect" review by Lucid Screening
 
 
 "Timeline for a Timeless Story" essay by Jim O'Rourke

External links
 
 

1969 films
1969 drama films
1969 LGBT-related films
Japanese drama films
Japanese LGBT-related films
1960s Japanese-language films
Films based on works by Sophocles
Films directed by Toshio Matsumoto
Japanese avant-garde and experimental films
Japanese black-and-white films
Films set in Tokyo
Films shot in Tokyo
Films about trans women
LGBT-related drama films
Works based on Oedipus Rex
Modern adaptations of works by Sophocles
1960s Japanese films